The University of Engineering & Technology, Mardan (UET Mardan) is a public university located in Mardan, Khyber Pakhtunkhwa, Pakistan.

History 
Government of Khyber Pakhtunkhwa established a sub campus of University of Engineering and Technology, Peshawar in Mardan in 2002. It was upgraded into a full-fledged university in October 2017.

Departments 
 Computer Software Engineering
 Electrical Engineering
 Telecommunication Engineering
 Civil Engineering
 Mechanical Engineering
 Computer Science

See also 
 Abdul Wali Khan University Mardan
 Women University Mardan
 Bacha Khan Medical College, Mardan

References

External links 
 UET Mardan official website

Public universities and colleges in Khyber Pakhtunkhwa
Educational institutions established in 2002
2002 establishments in Pakistan
Mardan
Engineering universities and colleges in Pakistan